The High Commissioner of the United Kingdom to Malta is the United Kingdom's foremost diplomatic representative in the Republic of Malta, and head of the UK's diplomatic mission there.

As fellow members of the Commonwealth of Nations, the United Kingdom and Malta conduct their diplomatic relations at governmental level, rather than between Heads of State.  Therefore, they exchange High Commissioners rather than ambassadors.

High Commissioners
1962–1965: Sir Edward Wakefield, Bt. (Commissioner before independence from 1962 to 1964)
1965–1967: Sir John Martin
1967–1970: Sir Geofroy Tory
1970–1972: Sir Duncan Watson
1972–1974: Sir John Moreton
1974–1976: Robin Haydon
1976–1979: Norman Aspin
1980–1982: David Aiers
1982–1985: Charles Booth
1985–1987: Stanley Duncan
1988–1991: Brian Hitch 
1991–1994: Sir Peter Wallis
1995–1999: Graham Archer
1999–2002: Howard Pearce
2002–2006: Sir Vincent Fean
2006–2008: Nicholas Archer
2009–2012: Louise Stanton
2012–2016: Robert Luke

2016–: Stuart Gill

References

External links
UK and Malta, gov.uk

Malta
 
United Kingdom